Robert J. Horner (September 14, 1894 – July 29, 1942) was an American film producer, director and screenwriter. He produced more than 40 films between 1922 and 1935. He also directed more than 30 films between 1921 and 1935. Horner died on July 29, 1942, at the El Paso, Texas City-County Hospital, and the cause of death was cirrhosis of the liver.

Selected filmography

 The Champion Liar (1920) (writer)
 The Smilin' Kid (1920) (writer)
 Midnight Secrets (1924) (producer, writer)
 Virginian Outcast (1924) (producer, director)
 The Pell Street Mystery (1924) (producer)
 Pony Express Rider (1926) (writer, director, producer)
 Walloping Kid (1926) (writer, director, producer)
 Across the Plains (1928) (writer, director, producer)
 The Mystery Rider (1928) (writer)
 Trails of Treachery (1928) (director)
 Cheyenne Trails (1928) (director, producer)
 Fighters of the Saddle (1929) (director)
 The White Outlaw (1929) (director)
 The Cheyenne Kid (1930) (producer)
 The Apache Kid's Escape (1930) (writer, producer and director)
 Trails of the Golden West (1931) (producer)
 Wild West Whoopee (1931) (writer, producer and director)
 Pueblo Terror (1931) (producer)
 The Kid from Arizona (1931) (co-writer, producer and director)
 The Sheriff's Secret (1931) (producer)
 Lariats and Six-Shooters (1931) (producer)
 Riders of Golden Gulch (1932) (producer)
 45 Calibre Echo (1932) (producer)
 Tex Takes a Holiday (1932) (producer)
 The Whirlwind Rider (1933) (producer and director)
 Trails of Adventure (1933) (producer)
 Border Guns (1934) (producer and director)
 The Border Menace (1934) (writer and co-producer)
 Western Racketeers (1934) (co-producer and director)
 Racketeer Roundup (AKA: Gunners and Guns) (1934) (co-producer and director)
 The Phantom Cowboy (1935) (co-producer and director)
 Defying The Law (1935) (co-producer and director)

References

External links

1894 births
1942 deaths
American male screenwriters
Film directors from Illinois
Film producers from Illinois
People from Spring Valley, Illinois
Screenwriters from Illinois
20th-century American male writers
20th-century American screenwriters
Deaths from cirrhosis
Alcohol-related deaths in Texas